Christian Friedrich Fritzsche (17 August 1776 in Naundorf near Zeitz – 29 October 1850 in Zürich) was a German Protestant theologian. He was the father of theologian Otto Fridolinus Fritzsche and of philologist Franz Volkmar Fritzsche.

From 1792 he studied theology at the University of Halle, afterwards working as a pastor in Steinbach und Lauterbach (from 1799). In 1809 he became a preacher and superintendent in the community of Dobrilugk. In 1827 he was named an honorary professor of theology at Halle, where in 1830 he gained a full professorship. He was interested in public school education, and he wrote monographs and articles on contemporary theological issues from a supernaturalistic viewpoint.

Published works 
In 1838 a collection of his writings were published with the title, Fritzschiorum opuscula academica. Later on, a collection of his writings were issued as Nova opuscula academica (1846). The following is a list of a few of his writings:
 "De revelationis notione biblia commentatio", 1828.
 "De spiritu sancto commentatio exegetica et dogmatica", 1840.
 "De ratione docendi Socratica in institutione academica", 1846.

References 

1776 births
1850 deaths
People from Teuchern
19th-century German Protestant theologians
University of Halle alumni
Academic staff of the University of Halle